Eucereon abdominalis is a moth of the subfamily Arctiinae. It was described by Francis Walker in 1855. It is found in Venezuela.

References

 

abdominalis
Moths described in 1855